INEK is an obscure PHP framework used by an extremely small percentage of the PHP community. It was a student's master's degree project, with the goal of demonstrating PHP's abilities in a web context similar to Java struts. INEK is "Java Struts from a PHP Perspective".

The INEK framework pioneered the notion of C2C (Configuration-to-Client), whereby all framework configuration is sent in a session cookie to every client.

References

PHP frameworks